Atcel Olmedo (previously known as the DuPage Johnny Doe) was an American toddler who was allegedly murdered by his abusive stepfather and his mother in 2005 and disposed of in Naperville, Illinois. His body was not positively identified until 2011. The case received national attention and was broadcast on several different television shows. Forensic evidence obtained from the body during the investigation was analyzed to assist in his future identification. His case remains unprosecuted; the two main suspects were released on a bond, and promptly disappeared. Authorities believe the suspects fled to the Mexico City area.

Discovery
In October 2005, a small body was found in an unincorporated area alongside the Ronald Reagan Memorial Tollway (Interstate 88). between Naperville and Warrenville, Illinois. The corpse was wrapped in a blue laundry bag and clothed in a blue button-down collared shirt with matching pants. The remains were decomposed beyond recognition, having been exposed to the elements for at least several weeks and possibly as long as one year.

The medical examiner determined that the body was that of a Hispanic, Native American, or Asian male between three and five years of age. The boy had black hair. However, due to the advanced decomposition of the body, eye color and cause of death could not be determined. The body was interred following a grave-side service in October 2007. He was buried in a donated plot, accompanied by a teddy bear and a multi-design decorated blanket.

Investigation

The clothing that the then-unidentified victim wore, Faded Glory, was traced to Walmart, its exclusive retailer. They were presumed to have been purchased in Naperville, at a Walmart store near where the body was found. The company assisted with the investigation, as it released for review all records of purchases of the items; only one sale could not be traced, as it was a cash purchase. The child's footprints were taken and compared to those from hospitals in the area, but did not match any of the records. By studying isotopes from his body, it was believed that he had lived in Illinois for most, if not all, of his short life. The analysis also indicated that his mother had lived in the northern part of the continent, where she spent most of her pregnancy.

In 2005, an investigator from the National Center for Missing and Exploited Children became involved in Olmedo's case, the solving of which was made a priority by the organization. The evidence was compared to that of at least 12 missing boys from Illinois and other missing children in the United States who were of the same age range and race. His face was also forensically reconstructed many times in 3D and 2D, along with a digital rendering to give an approximation of his likeness when he was alive. To assist with the search for the victim's identity, television shows such as America's Most Wanted and Without a Trace broadcast the case.

Life
Atcel was born November 2002 in Mexico. Sometime in 2003 he and his five siblings were left with relatives while his mother and stepfather went to live in the United States. Some time later (between 2004 and early 2005) his mother sent for Atcel and another sibling to join her in the U.S. In late 2005 his mother and stepfather returned to Mexico without Atcel. His siblings were told that he went to live with his biological father elsewhere in Mexico; whenever Atcel was mentioned the siblings were beaten. The last known sighting of Atcel was by the sibling also living in the US, who remembered a friend of the stepfather driving off, with Atcel still in the back seat.

Identification
In 2006, the family came to the United States illegally and settled in Cicero, Illinois. In early 2008 police were working on a child abuse case and came to believe that DuPage Johnny Doe may have been a victim of the same person. The oldest child asked police to look into what happened to her missing brother; she told police that her stepfather's mother told her in 2006 that Atcel had been murdered a month before his third birthday.  His death, it was claimed, was due to the abuse of his mother and stepfather.

Olmedo was identified through DNA comparison; his sister stated that she believed the image created by the National Center for Missing & Exploited Children was the most accurate of the facial reconstructions that were created, but did not have any photograph of her brother to compare it to. The siblings heard that the remains were Atcel's via news reports in February 2011; the next day the siblings visited his then unmarked grave. His name was finally added to the headstone, which also states the date his remains were found and the inscription "Son, Unknown, but not forgotten".

Current status of case
The mother declined to answer questions about Atcel, according to a report of her interview on May 6, 2008. The stepfather, who had been arrested more than a dozen times under various aliases from 2000 to 2007 in DuPage and Cook counties, faces up to 15 years in prison if convicted of identity fraud and conspiracy to defraud the United States. Police described him as friendly and cooperative. A few weeks later both suspects, who have not been officially charged (which is why their names have not been released) disappeared, after being released on a bond. Officials believe that they likely fled to the Mexico City area.

The investigation into Atcel's death remains "ongoing and open," but faces many legal challenges. The U.S. Department of Justice, at DuPage County's request, sought legal assistance from Mexican authorities to locate Atcel's birth certificate and to locate and interview the couple and the stepfather's mother.

An $11,000 reward is being offered for information leading to the killers.

See also
List of solved missing person cases
List of unsolved murders
Murder of Anjelica Castillo

References

2000s missing person cases
2005 in Illinois
2005 murders in the United States
Deaths by person in Illinois
Male murder victims
Missing person cases in Illinois
Unsolved murders in the United States
Incidents of violence against boys
U.S. Route 30